Metropolitan Korniliy, secular name Konstantin Ivanovich Titov; born August 1, 1947, in Orekhovo-Zuyevo, Moscow Oblast, Soviet Union is a Russian Orthodox Old-Rite Church bishop; Metropolitan of Moscow and All Rus, Primate of the Russian Orthodox Old-Rite Church (since October 18, 2005).

Positions 
Cornelius openly supports the 2022 Russian invasion of Ukraine and endorses the actions of the Russian army. He claimed that in Ukraine people would get killed only for thinking and speaking Russian. Cornelius called on the Ukrainian side to lay down their arms and "stop the genocide, the madness".

References

External links
 Official web site of Russian Orthodox Old-Rite Church. Metropolitan of Moscow and all Russia Korniliy. A brief biography. (Russian)

1947 births
Living people
People from Orekhovo-Zuyevo
Old Believers
Bishops of the Russian Orthodox Old-Rite Church
20th-century Eastern Orthodox Christians
21st-century Eastern Orthodox bishops